Plumutan is a village in Kemangkon district, Central Java, Indonesia. The village has two mosques, the Taman Pendidikan Al-Qur'an (TPQ/TPA) Al Huda mosque and the Majelis Taklim (MT) Al Muttaqin mosque.

Economy 
Most of people work a farmer and half a factory.

References

Central Java